Fushun Road is a station on Line 18 of the Shanghai Metro. Located at the intersection of North No. 2 Zhongshan Road and Jiangpu Road in Yangpu District, Shanghai, the station is open with the rest of phase one of Line 18 on 30 December 2021. The station is named after Fushun Road, which intersects Jiangpu Road one block to the south of the station.

References 

Railway stations in Shanghai
Shanghai Metro stations in Yangpu District
Line 18, Shanghai Metro
Railway stations in China opened in 2021